Pat Gardner (born March 22, 1940, in Alpena, Michigan ) is a Democratic member of the Georgia House of Representatives, representing the 57th District since 2001.

Committees
She serves on the House Appropriations, Transportation, Higher Education and Natural Resources & Environment Committees and the Appropriations Committee's Health Subcommittee. She is the Treasurer of the Working Families Caucus, Chair of the Health and Welfare Subcommittee of the Fulton County Delegation, and immediate past chair of the Women's Legislative Caucus.

Family
Pat is married to her husband Jerry and together they have 2 children named Anita and Bradley. Pat and her husband currently live in Morningside, Georgia.

Education
Gardner received her BA from the University of Madrid and New York University Study Abroad Program. She also later attended the University of Michigan and Stephens College.

References

External links
http://www.house.ga.gov/Representatives/en-US/member.aspx?Member=109&Session=21
http://www.house.ga.gov/Documents/Biographies/gardnerPat.pdf

Living people
1940 births
University of Michigan alumni
21st-century American politicians
Democratic Party members of the Georgia House of Representatives